Thanh Thủy may refer to several places in Vietnam:

 , a rural commune of Vị Xuyên District
 , a rural commune of Thanh Liêm District
 , a rural commune of Thanh Hà District
 , a rural commune of Thanh Chương District
 , a township and capital of Thanh Thủy District
 Thanh Thủy, Quảng Bình, a rural commune of Lệ Thủy District
 , a rural commune of Nghi Sơn
 Thanh Thủy District, a rural district of Phú Thọ Province